Saint Tudglyd (alternatively Tudclud, Tydclyd, Tudglud, Tutclyt, Tudclyd or Tyddyd) was a 6th-century saint of North Wales, who is said to have been one of the seven sons of King Seithenyn, whose legendary kingdom, Cantref y Gwaelod in Cardigan Bay was submerged by the sea. He would therefore be the brother of the saints Gwynhoedl, Merin (or Meirin), Tudno and Senewyr. He is associated with the town of Llandudno. The church of St Tudclud in Penmachno is dedicated to him. His feast day is 30 May.

References

6th-century Christian saints
6th-century births 
Year of birth unknown
Year of death unknown
6th-century Welsh people